Oxybelis aeneus, commonly known as the Mexican vine snake or brown vine snake, is a species of colubrid snake, which is endemic to the Americas.

Geographic range and habitat
O. aeneus is found from within the Atascosa, Patagonia, and Pajarito mountains of southern Arizona in the United States, through Mexico, to northern South America and Trinidad and Tobago.

Within Arizona, O. aeneus is exclusively affiliated with Madrean Evergreen Woodland communities and the upper reaches of adjacent semidesert grassland habitat. It is usually encountered in trees or shrubs on open, steep, and grassy slopes, but is also associated with wooded canyons, especially those with abundant vegetation.

Description
Its color may vary from gray to brown with a yellow underside.

 

The body is laterally compressed. The snout is prominent, its length more than two times the diameter of the eye. There is 1 preocular, and there are 2 postoculars. There is 1 anterior temporal, and there are 2 posterior temporals. There is no loreal scale, and there are 8-10 upper labials.

The smooth dorsal scales are arranged in 17 rows at midbody.

Ventrals 173-205; subcaudals 150-188, divided (paired). The anal plate is divided in Arizona specimens, but is entire in South American specimens.

Common names
In Arizona O. aeneus is also called "pike-headed tree snake". In Trinidad and Tobago and Guyana, it is known as a "horse whip" or "vine snake".

Behavior
Mostly arboreal and diurnal, O. aeneus is quite often mistaken for a vine. When threatened, it sometimes releases foul smelling secretions from its vent.

Diet
O. aeneus feeds mainly on lizards (mostly anoles), but also eats frogs, small rodents and birds.

Venom
O. aeneus is a mildly venomous rear-fanged snake, but it is not considered dangerous to humans.

Reproduction
O. aeneus is oviparous. Clutch sizes of 3-6 have been published. In Arizona, hatching occurs in September.

References

Further reading
Behler, John L.; King, F. Wayne (1979). The Audubon Society Field Guide to North American Reptiles and Amphibians. New York: Alfred A. Knopf. 743 pp. . (Oxybelis aeneus, pp. 641–642).

Schmidt, Karl P.; Davis, D. Dwight (1941). Field Book of Snakes of the United States and Canada. New York: G.P. Putnam's Sons. 365 pp. (Oxybelis microphthalmus, pp. 266–268, Figure 88).
Stebbins, Robert C. (2003). A Field Guide to Western Reptiles and Amphibians, Third Edition. The Peterson Field Guide Series ®. Boston and New York: Houghton Mifflin. xiii + 533 pp. . (Oxybelis aeneus, pp. 402–403 + Plate 47 + Map 144).
Wagler, "Jean" [sic] (1824). "Serpentum Brasiliensium species novae, ou histoire naturelle des espèces nouvelles de serpens, recueillies et observées pendant le voyage dans l'intèrieur du Brésil dans les années 1817, 1818, 1819, 1820, exécuté par ordre de sa Majesté le Roi de Baviére ". In: Spix, '"Jean de" [sic] (1824). Animalia nova sive species novae. Munich: F.S. Hübbschmann. viii + 75 pp. + Plates I-XXVI. (Dryinus aeneus, new species, pp. 12–13 + Plate III). (in Latin and French).
Zim, Herbert S.; Smith, Hobart M. (1956). Reptiles and Amphibians: A Guide to Familiar Species: A Golden Nature Guide. New York: Simon and Schuster. 160 pp. (Oxybelis aeneus, pp. 82, 84, 156).

External links
Oxybelis aeneus eating a rosebelly lizard (Sceloporus variabilis)

Colubrids
Reptiles of Mexico
Reptiles of the United States
Reptiles of Trinidad and Tobago
Vertebrates of Guyana
Reptiles of Central America
Reptiles of Guatemala
Taxa named by Johann Georg Wagler
Reptiles described in 1824